Martha Chanjo Lunji was a Malawian Democratic Progressive Party politician who was the Member of Parliament (MP) for Nkhotakota North East from 2014 until her death in 2021. She was Chief Whip of the DPP in opposition and had served as Minister of Labour, Skills and Innovation in Peter Mutharika's government.

Personal life
Lunji held a Bachelor of Science in Electrical Engineering. She died of COVID-19-related complications on the night of 13 July 2021 at Kamuzu Central Hospital.

See also
Politics of Malawi

References

20th-century births
2021 deaths
21st-century Malawian politicians
Deaths from the COVID-19 pandemic in Malawi
Democratic Progressive Party (Malawi) politicians
Malawian women in politics
Members of the National Assembly (Malawi)
Women government ministers of Malawi
Year of birth missing